In anatomy, posterolateral palatal pits are gaps at the sides of the back of the bony palate, near the last molars. Posterolateral palatal pits are present, in various degrees of development, in several members of the rodent family Cricetidae. Many members of the family lack them or have only simple pits, but Arvicolinae (voles, lemmings, and relatives) and Oryzomyini (rice rats and relatives) have more highly developed posterolateral palatal pits. Posterolateral palatal pits are also present in some other rodents, including Glis, Jaculus, Hystrix, Abrocoma, Ctenomys, Chinchilla, and Lagidium.

Sigmodontinae 

Many members of the mainly South American cricetid subfamily Sigmodontinae have posterolateral palatal pits.

In Oryzomyini (rice rats), the largest tribe of the Sigmodontinae, all but some species—Mindomys hammondi and Sigmodontomys aphrastus usually have only one small pit on each side of the palate—have prominent posterolateral palatal pits, often more than one on each side of the palate. In many oryzomyines, the pits are located in a deep depression or fossa. This depression has been termed the "palatal fossa" in the genus Cerradomys; its varying depth serves as a diagnostic character separating some of the species. The presence of complex posterolateral palatal pits is a synapomorphy either of Oryzomyini or of Oryzomyini minus Mindomys. Members of the genus Nephelomys usually have complex posterolateral palatal pits, recessed into deep fossae, but N. caracolus and N. nimbosus have simpler pits. One of the putative subdivisions within Oryzomyini, Clade D, has posterolateral palatal pits recessed into a fossa as one of its synapomorphies, although the feature is reversed in several subgroups. The extinct island endemic Noronhomys vespuccii also had smaller pits, perhaps because of its short palate.

Among members of the tribe Thomasomyini, posterolateral palatal pits are small or absent. Aepeomys lacks them, but Rhagomys longilingua does have posterolateral palatal pits. The possible thomasomyine Abrawayaomys chebezi has small posterolateral palatal pits.

Members of the Phyllotini tribe always have posterolateral palatal pits. In some species, they are displaced to the back from their usual position just before the mesopterygoid fossa into the fossa. The condition of the pits has been used to separate species of Phyllotis.

The tribe Ichthyomyini is characterized by inconspicuous posterolateral palatal pits.

Arvicolinae
Arvicolinae, a group that includes the voles and lemmings, usually have posterolateral palatal pits, but the configuration of the pits is variable. In some species, the pits do not extend to the ventral face of the palate.

Neotominae
Posterolateral palatal pits are poorly developed or absent in many members of the mostly North American subfamily Neotominae, including Peromyscus (deer mice) and related genera.

Cladistics
The presence and development of posterolateral palatal pits has been used as a character in cladistic analyses of oryzomyines by Weksler (2006), Carleton and Olson (1999), and Carleton and Musser (1989); neotomines by Carleton (1980);  and phyllotines by Steppan (1995).

References

Literature cited

Carleton, M.D. 1989. Systematics and evolution. Pp. 7–141 in Kirkland, G.L. and Layne, J.N. (eds.). Advances in the study of Peromyscus (Rodentia). Lubbock: Texas Tech University Press.

Luna, L. and Patterson, B.D. 2003. A remarkable new mouse (Muridae: Sigmodontinae) from southeastern Peru: with comments on the affinities of Rhagomys rufescens (Thomas, 1886). Fieldiana Zoology 101:1–24.
Pardiñas, U.F.J., Teta, P. and D'Elía, G. 2009. Taxonomy and distribution of Abrawayaomys (Rodentia: Cricetidae), an Atlantic Forest endemic with the description of a new species. Zootaxa 2128:39–60.

Steppan, S.J. 1995. Revision of the tribe Phyllotini (Rodentia: Sigmodontinae), with a phylogenetic hypothesis for the Sigmodontinae. Fieldiana Zoology 80:1–112.

Rodent anatomy